TV Paulista was a Brazilian television station. It was created on March 14, 1952 in São Paulo. In 1966, it was incorporated into Rede Globo. The means by which TV Paulista was allegedly "incorporated" by Rede Globo de Televisão are still being discussed in the tribunals. There is a big controversy concerning this acquisition for Brazil was under a dictatorship and there are no documents that prove TV Paulista was in fact bought by Rede Globo. The former owners of TV Paulista complain that many documents presented by Rede Globo are fake.

Defunct television channels in Brazil
Television channels and stations established in 1952
Television channels and stations disestablished in 1966
1952 establishments in Brazil
1966 disestablishments in Brazil
Mass media in São Paulo